Fatal Beauty is a 1987 American action comedy thriller film directed by Tom Holland, and starring Whoopi Goldberg as Detective Rita Rizzoli, and Sam Elliott as Mike Marshak. The screenplay was written by Hilary Henkin and Dean Riesner. The original music score was composed by Harold Faltermeyer, of Top Gun fame. The film was marketed with the tagline "An earthquake is about to hit L.A. It's called Detective Rita Rizzoli."

Plot

Detective Rita Rizzoli (Whoopi Goldberg) an undercover narcotics police officer, stages an undercover buy with drug dealer Tito Delgadillo (Fred Asparagus). During the bust she sees her friend and informant Charlene (Cathianne Blore) being dragged out of the bar by her pimp and runs to her aid, thus alerting Delgadillo of her being an undercover cop. After saving Charlene and shooting the pimp, Rizzoli notices all the money used for the buy is missing. Delgadillo retreats to a warehouse in Los Angeles where a family of Asian immigrants is preparing plastic envelopes of imported cocaine stamped with the gang's brand name "Fatal Beauty". One worker, however, has been sampling too much of the drug and, in his intoxicated state, prepares envelopes with a fatally high concentration of cocaine and a misaligned stamp. Delgadillo discovers the error but before they can correct it, the house is attacked by two small-time hoods, Leo Nova and Earl Skinner (Brad Dourif and Mike Jolly) who kill everyone within including Delgadillo and steal the lethal product.

Back at the police station, Rizzoli is chewed out by her boss, Lt. Kellerman (John P. Ryan), for ruining the bust. He receives a call saying Rizzoli is needed at the warehouse where the drugs were being made. At the warehouse Rizzoli identifies Delgadillo (the only victim authorities weren't able to identify because his face was mutilated during the attack) by pointing out the diamond pinkie ring on his finger bearing his initials that he showed Rizzoli earlier that evening. Rizzoli also discovers traces of "Fatal Beauty" and Charlie Dawson's body, which was stuffed in a van labeled "Kroll Enterprises". The next morning Rizzoli receives a call from Charlene, asking for money. When Rizzoli refuses, Charlene offers some information about the drug-related murder the previous night, hoping to sway Rizzoli to give her the money. Charlene tells Rizzoli that there is a goon squad looking for the killers. She also tells her that the person, to whom all the drugs belonged, drove a "Rolls." That prompts Rizzoli to pay a visit to Conrad Kroll (Harris Yulin), whom she accuses of drug dealing.

After leaving Kroll's home, Rizzoli hears a call for assistance over the scanner involving a police standoff. Realizing that Charlene lives there, she immediately rushes to the location. At the location a man who is hopped up on drugs emerges from Charlene's house and shoots Rizzoli's fellow officer, Shigeda (Steve Akahoshi) in the arm, wounding him. The assembled officers all open fire on the man, but due to the drugs in his system, he doesn't go down right away. After the man finally falls to the ground and dies, Rizzoli runs into Charlene's house, where she attempts to resuscitate her with no success. Rizzoli is told by a boy at the location that both Charlene and the man who was shot, "Big Bubba" were both taken out by the new drugs and that they got it from Charlene's new pimp, "Jimmy". Rizzoli and her partner Detective Jimenez (Rubén Blades) find him in a restaurant, where Rizzoli places him under arrest; when he tries to escape, she shoots him in the buttocks. After hanging him up in the freezer and threatening more bodily harm, Rizzoli gets him to reveal that he purchased the drugs from a buy house from a man named Rafael. Rizzoli heads to the buy house the pimp told her about and is greeted by a man named Epifanio, who tells her he will get her what she wants. She is able to get Epifanio to take her to Rafael, but a hood from the night she staged the bust with Delgadillo recognizes her as a cop and immediately alerts Nova and Skinner. Rizzoli is able to get locked in a room with Rafael, where she gets Rafael to admit he is fronting for Nova and Skinner right as two of his crew members shoot their way inside. Rizzoli dives for safety, but Rafael is killed in the crossfire. Rizzoli shoots down one of the thugs, but the other gets the drop on her, but she is saved by the timely arrival of Mike Marshak, Kroll's bodyguard (Sam Elliott) who shows up at the buy house to help Rizzoli, and admits that he has been following her around since the night before by using a transmitter concealed under her bumper. After taking out the rest of Rafael's gang, Rizzoli and Marshak come close to apprehending Nova and Skinner when a section of the a roof collapses on Rizzoli; Marshak immediately runs to her aid, letting Nova and Skinner escape.

Rizzoli is taken to a nearby hospital, Vista Verde where Marshak goes to visit her. Upon walking into Rizzoli's room, Marshak sees Rizzoli and Jiminez going over the mug shots of Nova and Skinner and Jiminez immediately leaves after Marshak's arrival. When Jiminez goes toward the elevator he notices Nova from the mug shot carrying a package and orders him to freeze. Nova pulls out a shotgun from the package and fires at Jiminez, missing him. After getting into an argument about what Marshak's boss Kroll is allegedly doing, Rizzoli agrees to let Marshak drive her home. Rizzoli notices her cat on the roof and explains to Marshak about her cat's fear of heights and her front door being open. They both go into her residence see Zack Yeager (James LeGros) asleep. Yeager tells Rizolli that all his friends have died from using Fatal Beauty. This is further confirmed when he, Rizzoli and Marshak arrive at the home of one of the kids who threw the party and finds them all lying dead in the living room. Yeager tells Rizolli he got the drugs from his mother, Cecille (Jennifer Warren). When Rizzoli goes to Cecille in an attempt to get information about where the drugs came from, the two get into a physical altercation until Marshak arrives to break it up and takes Rizolli home. At home, Rizzoli invites Marshak into her house for some coffee and receives a phone call that four young children had died from using Fatal Beauty; Rizzoli then has a breakdown and tells Marshak that she is a recovering drug addict, having quit after her daughter got into her drug stash and drowned in a swimming pool. Rizzoli takes a shower, during which she receives a call and notices Marshak has left, and that he went through her police files of the suspects she was after. At the point Rizzoli learns that Kroll had sent Marshak not to protect Rizzoli, but to spy on her to find out who ripped him off.

Rizzoli receives a call from Cecille learning that Zack had cut his wrist and was in the hospital. Cecille asks Rizzoli to meet her at the hospital where she reveals who she bought the drugs from and that her supplier, Denny Mifflin (Neill Barry), will be making a pickup from his suppliers Nova and Skinner at Kroll Plaza. Rizzoli and Jiminez head to Kroll plaza and are spotted by Kroll's security team. Rizolli and Jiminez are watching Mifflin and Rizolli orders Jiminez to get the drugs away from some kids that they spotted Mifflin selling to. When Jiminez gets the drugs from the kids he is knocked out by one of Kroll's security men. When Kroll is alerted to Rizzoli's presence, Marshak who is with Kroll notices Nova and Skinner entering the plaza. Kroll orders one of his men to take out Nova and Skinner and then orders Marshak to take out Rizzoli. Rizzoli meanwhile notices Nova, Skinner, Mifflin and his bodyguard, Frankenstein (Mark Pellegrino) meeting together in a mall store to discuss drug distribution and follows them into the store. Rizzoli is followed into the store by Kroll's security team with their guns drawn. Just as Rizzoli is about to bust Nova, Skinner, Mifflin and Frankenstein she is accosted by Marshak who warns her it is a wipeout in which all five of them are going to be killed. Rizzoli then punches Marshak, which frightens Nova, Skinner, Mifflin and Frankenstein. When running in the store, Frankenstein is grabbed by one of the security guards. He then stabs him in the stomach. The security guard falls to the ground knocking over a rack of clothes. Frankenstein then is grabbed by Kroll's bodyguard, Eddie and is shot three times in the stomach. Frankenstien slashes Eddie's arm with his switchblade, forcing him to back off, but dies seconds later while calling to Mifflin for help. Rizzoli then shoots Mifflin after he fires at her. Rizzoli and the security guards pursuit Nova and Skinner, who open fire in the mall, killing several guards and Eddie, and then retreat into a sporting goods store, followed by another of Kroll's men and three surviving guards. Nova and Skinner race to the back of the store and shoot the fuse boxes, cutting the main power to the store lights (but the emergency lights come on seconds after). Rizzoli cautiously makes her way through the store, but the security guards get the drop on her, but she is inadvertently saved by Nova and Skinner when they gun the guards down. A short gun fight ensues between Rizzoli and the two men, but she runs out of ammunition. Nova and Skinner try to move in and finish her off, but she manages to give them the slip long enough to break into a gun cabinet and get a lever action rifle and some bullets. After Rizzoli kills Kroll's other bodyguard who was poised to ambush her from above and takes his gun, the shelf he was standing on collapses on her and Skinner prepares to kill her; at the last minute, however, Marshak appears and guns him down. Nova wounds Marshak before he, in turn, is wounded by Rizzoli, and retreats from the store. Rizzoli pursues Nova and runs into Kroll, who is about to kill her when Nova jumps out of a hiding place and kills him. Rizzoli follows Nova into a parking garage and shoots him several times, apparently unable to injure him. After Nova reveals to Rizzoli he was wearing a bullet-proof vest this whole time Rizolli pulls out a gun she stole from the dead guard and shoots Nova in the throat, killing him.

Rizzoli meets the paramedics outside the plaza, where Jiminez is waiting along with Marshak, who muses to Rizzoli that he might be going to jail for a long time because of his connection to Kroll. Rizzoli agrees, but tenderly tells him that she'll be waiting for him when he gets out. She then gives him a kiss and tells him with a smile that he'll be fine.

Cast
 Whoopi Goldberg as Detective Rita Rizzoli
 Sam Elliott as Mike Marshak
 Rubén Blades as Detective Carl Jimenez
 Harris Yulin as Conrad Kroll
 John P. Ryan as Lieutenant Kellerman
 Jennifer Warren as Cecile Jaeger
 Brad Dourif as Leo Nova
 Mike Jolly as Earl Skinner
 Charles Hallahan as Sergeant Getz
 M. C. Gainey as Detective Barndollar
 James LeGros as Zack Jaeger
 Celeste Yarnall as Laura
 James Smith as Charlie
 Mark Pellegrino as "Frankenstein"
 Neill Barry as Denny Miflin
 Clayton Landey as Jimmy Silver
 Ebbe Roe Smith as Marty
 Walter Robles as Clay
 Cathianne Blore as Charlene
 Steve Akahoshi as Detective Shigeta
 Larry Hankin as Jerry Murphy
 Bernie Hern as Mike Weinstein
 Cheech Marin as The Bartender
 David Harris as Raphael
 Fred Asparagus as Tito Delgadillo
 Gary Carlos Cervantes as Basquel
 Emilia Avarza as Candy
 Michael Delorenzo as "Flaco"
 Rick Telles as Epifanio
 Prince Hughes as Bubba "Big Bubba"
 Michael Champion as "Buzz"

Production
In May 1986, Cher was announced as star. In July 1986, John Milius was working on the script and intending to direct. Cher ended up dropping out to star in Moonstruck. By November, Tom Holland was attached as director with Whoopi Goldberg to star.

Brad Dourif's performance as the villain led to Holland casting him as the villain in Child's Play.

Reception

Critical
The film was unpopular with many critics (though Roger Ebert gave it a positive review of 3 stars), some of whom considered it a rip-off of Beverly Hills Cop (which Faltermeyer also scored); others cited a lack of chemistry in the romance between Goldberg and Elliott's characters. 
Movie historian Leonard Maltin called it "inexcusably awful, with gratuitous violence and mind-boggling dialogue, using an anti-drug message to rationalize its excesses."
Fatal Beauty holds a score of 20% on Rotten Tomatoes based on 15 reviews.

Director Holland later admitted that Fatal Beauty was an effort to expand his range as a filmmaker beyond the horror genre, but that Fatal Beauty was a mistake. "Initially," he says today, "they planned to cast Cher as Rita. But she bowed out early on, which is what I should have done."

Soundtrack
 Fatal Beauty (soundtrack)

References

External links

 
 
 
 

1987 films
1980s action thriller films
1980s action comedy films
American action thriller films
American action comedy films
American comedy thriller films
1980s English-language films
Films set in Los Angeles
1980s police comedy films
American police detective films
Metro-Goldwyn-Mayer films
Films about drugs
Films directed by Tom Holland
Films scored by Harold Faltermeyer
1987 comedy films
1980s American films